Gimme an 'F' is a 1984 comedy film written by Jim Hart and directed by Paul Justman. The film stars John Karlen, Stephen Shellen, Mark Keyloun, Jennifer Cooke and Lisa Wilcox in a short role. It was also released under the titles T & A Academy 2 and Cheerballs (West Germany).

Plot
The plot centers on competition between high-school cheerleading squads - and one squad, in particular, the Moline Ducks, is poor. The competition takes place at a camp run by middle-aged Bucky Berkshire aka Dr. Spirit (John Karlen), who this year decides to place a bet with his best instructor Tom Hamilton (Stephen Shellen) that he cannot make the woeful Ducks into a team that can beat the top-rated Falcons. If Berkshire loses, he pays up $10,000, and if Hamilton loses, he has to work another five years at the camp.  Bucky Berkshire actually cannot stand Hamilton's antics, or his sexual but successful way of motivating the cheerleaders.  However, a visiting group of wealthy Japanese businessmen will not finance Bucky's latest business plan without Hamilton on board to teach the cheerleaders.  Thus, there is an ulterior motive behind Bucky's wager.  As the teams get ready for their rounds of competition, several dance sequences, various teen pranks, and the usual sexual situations common in teen comedies weave their way through the storyline.

References

External links

1984 films
1980s sex comedy films
20th Century Fox films
Cheerleading films
Films shot in Los Angeles
American teen comedy films
1980s English-language films
Teen sex comedy films
1984 comedy films
1980s American films